Vagner da Silva (born 6 June 1986), known as Vagner, is a Brazilian professional footballer who plays as a goalkeeper for Portuguese club S.C.U. Torreense.

Club career
Born in Araruna, Paraná, Vagner finished his formation with Club Athletico Paranaense after joining the club's youth system as a 15-year-old. He went on to be part of several Série A rosters with the main squad, but never appeared in any matches in the competition during his tenure.

Released in 2009, Vagner subsequently represented lowly Ituano Futebol Clube and Desportivo Brasil. In January 2010, owned by the latter, he was loaned to Portuguese side G.D. Estoril Praia, helping with 28 appearances in his second full season to help his team return to the Primeira Liga after seven years.

Vagner was again an undisputed starter from 2012 to 2014 under manager Marco Silva, as the Canaries consecutively qualified to the UEFA Europa League. In the summer of 2015, the free agent moved the Belgian First Division A with Royal Excel Mouscron.

On 3 January 2017, Vagner returned to Portugal and its top division, being loaned to Boavista F.C. until the end of the season. For the following campaign, the move was extended.

On 6 July 2018, Vagner signed a two-year contract with Qarabağ FK. On 22 June 2020, having played no Azerbaijan Premier League games during the season for the champions, he left.

Honours
Athletico Paranaense
Campeonato Paranaense: 2005

Estoril
Segunda Liga: 2011–12

Qarabağ
Azerbaijan Premier League: 2018–19

Individual
LPFP Segunda Liga Goalkeeper of the Year: 2011–12

References

External links

1986 births
Living people
Sportspeople from Paraná (state)
Brazilian footballers
Association football goalkeepers
Club Athletico Paranaense players
Ituano FC players
Desportivo Brasil players
Primeira Liga players
Liga Portugal 2 players
G.D. Estoril Praia players
Boavista F.C. players
C.D. Nacional players
S.C.U. Torreense players
Belgian Pro League players
Royal Excel Mouscron players
Azerbaijan Premier League players
Qarabağ FK players
Brazilian expatriate footballers
Expatriate footballers in Portugal
Expatriate footballers in Belgium
Expatriate footballers in Azerbaijan
Brazilian expatriate sportspeople in Portugal
Brazilian expatriate sportspeople in Belgium
Brazilian expatriate sportspeople in Azerbaijan